Clive Citrine Olaf Longe (23 February 1939 – 27 December 1986) was a British athlete. He competed in the men's decathlon at the 1968 Summer Olympics. Competing for Wales, he won a silver medal in the decathlon at the 1966 British Empire and Commonwealth Games.

On Christmas Eve 1986, while he was Bermuda's national athletics coach, he killed his girlfriend, before killing himself two days later.

References

External links
 
 Great Britain Athletes At Mexico Olympics 1968 Form Jazz And Blues Band

1939 births
1986 suicides
British Guiana people
Athletes (track and field) at the 1968 Summer Olympics
Welsh male athletes
British decathletes
Olympic athletes of Great Britain
Athletes (track and field) at the 1966 British Empire and Commonwealth Games
Commonwealth Games medallists in athletics
Commonwealth Games silver medallists for Wales
Guyanese emigrants to Wales
Black British sportspeople
British athletics coaches
Murder–suicides in North America
Suicides in the United Kingdom
Suicides by poison
Violent deaths in Bermuda
Medallists at the 1966 British Empire and Commonwealth Games